Islam Pura is a neighbourhood in District South of Karachi, Pakistan.

There are several ethnic groups in Islam Pura including Muhajirs, Sindhis, Punjabis, Kashmiris, Seraikis, Pakhtuns, Balochis, Memons, Bohras,  Ismailis, etc. The population of Saddar Town is estimated to be nearly one million.

Main areas 
 Dharam Siwara
 Azeem Plaza Area
 Shoe Market
 Bhatti Compound
 Haq Nagar
 Hashim Khan Baghicha
 Zoological Garden

See also 
 Millat Nagar

References

External links 
 Karachi Website 

Neighbourhoods of Karachi
Saddar Town